Ljubomir Ognjanović (Serbian Cyrillic: Љубомир Огњановић; 21 October 1933 – 28 May 2008) was a Serbian football player.

Born in Belgrade, Kingdom of Yugoslavia, he played his entire career with FK Radnički Beograd as a forward. He was part of the club between 1952 and 1967. After playing the first two seasons in the Yugoslav Second League, he was part of the team that won promotion to the Yugoslav First League in 1953. He played 198 matches and scored 18 goals in the top league until 1961, when FK Radnički was relegated not to be promoted again until Ognjanović retired in 1967.

He played one match for the Yugoslav national team in 1958.

References

1933 births
2008 deaths
Footballers from Belgrade
Serbian footballers
Yugoslav footballers
Yugoslavia international footballers
Association football forwards
FK Radnički Beograd players
Yugoslav First League players